is a Japanese baseball player. He won a bronze medal at the 1992 Summer Olympics.

References 
 Shinichiro Kawabata profile at DatabaseOlympics

1966 births
Baseball players at the 1992 Summer Olympics
Olympic baseball players of Japan
Living people
Olympic medalists in baseball

Medalists at the 1992 Summer Olympics
Olympic bronze medalists for Japan